Paul Woodrow Chrisman (born August 23, 1949), better known by his stage name Woody Paul, is an American singer, fiddler, and composer, best known for his work with the Western swing musical and comedy group Riders in the Sky. With the Riders, he is billed as "Woody Paul — King of the Cowboy Fiddlers". He was inducted into the National Fiddler Hall of Fame in 2012 and is "known in the music industry for being proficient and innovative across many musical genres including western, jazz, bluegrass, old-time, and Celtic." He has won two Grammy Awards with his band.

Biography

Early life 
Chrisman began playing fiddle when he was 11 years old. He played with Sam McGee and others regularly at the Grand Ole Opry in the mid-sixties. He is also extremely adept at lariat tricks. He attended Vanderbilt University in Nashville, Tennessee, and has a Ph.D. in theoretical plasma physics from MIT, where he wrote his thesis, "Inertial, Viscous, and Finite-Beta Effects in a Resistive, Time Dependent Tokamak Discharge", Thesis Nuc. Eng. 1976, PhD, supervised by James E. McCune. He returned to Nashville and began playing recording sessions and recorded and toured with Loggins & Messina.

Riders In The Sky 
In 1978, Chrisman approached the Riders (then consisting of just Douglas B. Green and Fred LaBour) backstage after a show and inquired about joining the group. Shortly before Chrisman approached the Riders, Williams "Bill" Collins had just left the group, so Green and LaBour were already looking for a replacement member, and Chrisman seemed like the perfect fit. Chrisman's first show with the Riders was at the 1978 Kentucky State Fair. As of 2023, Chrisman is still with the Riders.

Songwriting 
Prior to joining the Riders, Chrisman had already written "Blue Bonnet Lady" and "Cowboy Song" (both of which would be featured on the Riders' first album, Three on the Trail). Chrisman also wrote "So Long, Saddle Pals", what many would consider the Riders' equivalent of "Happy Trails".

Notable filmography

Television

Film

References

External links
 Riders in the Sky website

American country fiddlers
Living people
1949 births